Robert Balfour (c. 1553–1621; known also as Balforeus) was a Scottish philosopher.

He was educated at the University of St Andrews and the University of Paris. He was for many years principal of the College of Guienne at Bordeaux.

Works

His great work is his Commentarii in Organum Logicum Aristotelis (Bordeaux, 1618); the copy in the British Museum contains a number of highly eulogistic poems in honour of Balfour, who is described as Graium aemulus acer. Balfour was one of the scholars who contributed to spread over Europe the fame of the praefervidum ingenium Scotorum. His contemporary, Thomas Dempster, called him the "phoenix of his age, a philosopher profoundly skilled in the Greek and Latin languages, and a mathematician worthy of being compared with the ancients."

His Cleomedis meteora, with notes and Latin translation, was reprinted at Leiden as late as 1820.

References
 which in turn cites:
 Dempster, Historia Ecclesiastica Gent. Scotorum.
 Irving, Lives of the Scottish Writers.
 Anderson, Scottish Nation, i. 217.
Andrew Pyle (editor), Dictionary of Seventeenth Century British Philosophers (2000), article pp. 54–5.

Further reading
 
 

1550s births
1621 deaths
16th-century Scottish people
17th-century Scottish people
16th-century philosophers
17th-century philosophers
Scottish philosophers
Latin commentators on Aristotle
Alumni of the University of St Andrews
Robert, philosopher
Kingdom of Scotland expatriates in France
University of Paris alumni